Microbacterium saccharophilums is a Gram-positive, non-spore-forming, rod-shaped and non-motile bacterium from the genus Microbacterium which has been isolated from soil from a sucrose-refining factory in Japan.

References

Further reading

External links
Type strain of Microbacterium saccharophilum at BacDive -  the Bacterial Diversity Metadatabase

Bacteria described in 2013
saccharophilum